Michael Gene Adams (born March 27, 1976) is an American politician who is a member of the Republican Party. He is the secretary of state of the Commonwealth of Kentucky. He succeeded Alison Lundergan Grimes on January 6, 2020.

Early life and career 
Adams is from Paducah, Kentucky. He graduated from Reidland High School, the University of Louisville, and Harvard Law School.  Adams was the first in his family to get a bachelor's degree and attended Harvard Law School on low-income aid. After law school, Adams served as a judicial law clerk for Chief Judge John G. Heyburn II, of the U.S. District Court for the Western District of Kentucky. He worked for Mitch McConnell and Ernie Fletcher before becoming counsel to the deputy attorney general of the United States during the second term of President George W. Bush. After the Bush administration, Adams served as general counsel to the Republican Governors Association, before working in election law. He served as Mike Pence's political law attorney. Adams served as the campaign attorney for Eric Greitens.

Kentucky Secretary  of State

2019 election 
In the 2019 Kentucky elections, Adams ran for Secretary of State of Kentucky as a Republican.  He defeated former Kentucky Second Lady Heather French Henry in the general election on November 5.

Results

Tenure
Adams' highest legislative priority in his campaign was changing state law to require photo identification of voters. On April 14, 2020, in the midst of the COVID-19 pandemic, the Kentucky General Assembly passed a Voter ID law over Governor Beshear's veto.  

During the 2020 General Election, Adams implemented expanded procedures giving voters in Kentucky options to safely cast votes during the COVID-19 pandemic which included excuse-free absentee voting and three weeks of open polls. Adams' plan for the 2020 elections resulted in record voter turnout in Kentucky and received praise as a national model for how to conduct elections during a health pandemic.
In the 2021 legislative session, Adams led an effort to make several of the election reforms permanent.  The legislation garnered bipartisan support, and Governor Beshear signed it into law on April 7, 2021.

 The election reform measure includes 3 days of early in-person voting, transitions the state toward universal paper ballots, keeps the online portal for requesting absentee ballots, and allows counties to establish vote centers.

References

External links
Office of Kentucky Secretary of State Michael Adams

21st-century American lawyers
21st-century American politicians
George W. Bush administration personnel
Harvard Law School alumni
Kentucky lawyers
Kentucky Republicans
Living people
People from Paducah, Kentucky
Secretaries of State of Kentucky
University of Louisville alumni
1976 births